Pavlo Rebenok (born 23 July 1985) is a Ukrainian football manager and former player who played as a left midfielder.

Career
Initially, he joined Chornomorets on loan from Metalist Kharkiv in July 2008 in hopes of finding more playing time, as in Metalist he was limited to only 2 games during the entire season. In June 2012 he signed a three-year deal with Metalist Kharkiv.

References

External links
 Profile on Official Chornomorets Website
 
 
 

1985 births
Living people
People from Pokrov, Ukraine
Ukrainian footballers
FC Dnipro players
FC Elista players
FC Vorskla Poltava players
FC Metalist Kharkiv players
FC Chornomorets Odesa players
FC Torpedo-BelAZ Zhodino players
Ukrainian Premier League players
Ukrainian First League players
Belarusian Premier League players
Ukrainian expatriate footballers
Expatriate footballers in Russia
Ukrainian expatriate sportspeople in Russia
Expatriate footballers in Belarus
Ukrainian expatriate sportspeople in Belarus
Association football midfielders
Ukrainian football managers
Sportspeople from Dnipropetrovsk Oblast